SS Batavier V may refer to one of the following ships of the Batavier Line:

 , packet on the Batavier Line's Rotterdam–London service; captured in World War I by  German submarine  in March 1915; mined and sunk by German submarine  in May 1916
 , built as a post-World War I replacement for the first Batavier II and used on primarily on Rotterdam–London service until seized by German forces in 1940; sunk by British motor torpedo boat in 1941
 , built as a freight-only ship for Rotterdam–London service after passenger service ended in 1960; later named Satellite, Mohsein; broken up in 2004 in India

Ship names